Lagaren is a historic iron-hulled ship that formerly served as the Swedish lightvessel steamship No. 17 Svinbådan and was subsequently used as a workshop vessel and a schoolship. In 2010 the ship was flagged in the United States and since 2013 has been impounded in Santa Cruz, Tenerife in relation to a drug smuggling case.

History
Built by W. Lindbergs Varvs- och Verkstads AB between 1893 and 1894 the Lagaren was launched in 1894 as the lightship No. 17 Svinbådan for the Swedish Pilot Office. She served at the northern entrance to Öresund in that role until 1960 when she had her engine removed at the Kalmar dockyards and was reclassified as a workshop vessel with the name Lagaren. The refitted ship served as a service vessel for survey ships. Between 1968 and 1972 the ship itself  was used for hydrographic survey work. The Skeppsholmsgården foundation bought the ship in 1972 and rigged her as a sailing vessel with a schooner rig with the intention of using her as a schoolship. She was drydocked at Beckholmen in 1992 and outfitted with a bow propeller to increase maneuverability. In 1995 Skeppsholmsgården added a diesel engine to the ship, allowing her to once again become a primarily motor-powered vessel. The ship was a filming location for the Swedish crime thriller TV-series Graven (2004).

In late 2009 the foundation sold the ship to an American buyer. The new owner moved the ship to Portsmouth for refit and to Harlingen for re-rigging in 2010. The ship came to the attention of local media in the Canary Islands when police detained the vessel and arrested in crew in 2013 due to its involvement with an operation to ship cocaine from Cape Verde to the Canary Islands. The ship has remained in Santa Cruz de Tenerife ever since.

See also
List of oldest surviving ships

References

External links
The Swedish Lighthouse Society's Lexicon
Numerous photos of the ship in its current configuration on Shipspotting

 

Ships of the United States
Illegal drug trade
Ships of Sweden
Lightships